The Arizona Mountains forests are a temperate coniferous forests ecoregion of the southwest United States with a rich variety of woodland habitats and wildlife.

Setting
This is a landscape of steep mountains and high stony plateaus with rocky outcrops from the Kaibab Plateau in northern Arizona south to the Mogollon Plateau and eastwards across into southwestern New Mexico. Specific areas include the Gila Wilderness in New Mexico.

Flora
Trees of the area include some of the spruce, fir and quaking aspen (Populus tremuloides) trees typical of the Rocky Mountains further north along with typically Mexican trees such as Chihuahua pine (Pinus leiophylla), Apache pine (Pinus engelmannii) and the Arizona pine of the Gila Wilderness and elsewhere. The lower elevations have a mixed pinyon pine-juniper-oak woodland. Finally the rivers and their banks are important habitats for specific wildlife and fish.

Fauna
Wildlife found here include the miniature northern saw-whet owl and many birds and reptiles that are common in Mexico further south, such as the secretive Montezuma quail. The caves of the Guadalupe Mountains are a specific habitat for beetles, centipedes and other invertebrates.

Threats and preservation
This is a fairly stable ecoregion with about 25% of original habitat still intact although vulnerable to logging and overgrazing. Pollution and reduction of rivers are threatening specific plants and animals including Fremont cottonwood (Populus fremontii) and Goodding's willow (Salix gooddingii),  the threatened Gila trout (Oncorhynchus gilae), and the endangered southwestern willow flycatcher (Empidonax traillii extimus). Logging continues to remove habitat of the Mexican spotted owl (Strix occidentalis lucida) and the northern goshawk (Accipiter gentalis).

Large blocks of remaining habitat include: the Aldo Leopold Wilderness/Gila Wilderness/Blue Range Wilderness and the El Malpais National Monument and Conservation Area in southwestern New Mexico; the Kaibab National Forest, Blue Range Primitive Area, Grand Canyon National Park, the Mazatzal Mountains including Four Peaks, Superstition Mountains, Sycamore Canyon, Red Rock-Secret Mountain Wilderness, Hellsgate Wilderness, Pinal Mountains in the Tonto National Forest and the Galiuro Mountains in Arizona; the Chuska Mountains on Navajo lands; and the Guadalupe Mountains including the Carlsbad Caverns in southeastern New Mexico and western Texas. Much of this is linked and well-protected within national parkland.

See also
List of ecoregions in the United States (WWF)

References 

Temperate coniferous forests of the United States
Ecoregions of the United States
Forests of Arizona
Forests of New Mexico
Arizona Mountains
Arizona Mountains
Nearctic ecoregions